Slobodan "Čobo" Janjuš (born January 7, 1952) is a Yugoslav and Bosnian former professional football goalkeeper.

Club career
He represented a number of domestic clubs, having played with all of them, beside Second League FK Radnički Pirot, in the Yugoslav First League, namely, FK Željezničar Sarajevo, FK Vojvodina, FK Sarajevo, NK Olimpija Ljubljana, NK Dinamo Zagreb and FK Sutjeska Nikšić.

He won the Yugoslav First League in the 1971–72 season with Željezničar and also the Maltese Premier League in the 1989–90 season.

He also played in Malta and Germany.

He was the youngest starting goalkeeper in Yugoslav football history at the age of 17. Slobodan retired at the age of 40.

International career
Janjuš has also represented the Yugoslav national team 9 times in the years he played football.

Post-playing career
Since the early 1990s Janjuš has been living in the United States. Usually referred to as "Bobby" in the U.S., he worked as goalkeeping coach with MLS' Tampa Bay Mutiny. 

In 2008, he was appointed as the new goalkeeping coach at the newly established Tampa Bay Rowdies of the NASL. With the Rowdies, Bobby trained than USF goalkeeper Jeff Attinella. Attinella developed his skills under Bobby and became NASL best goalkeeper which eventually grabbed MLS's Real Salt Lake's attention who bought Attinella's contract. Bobby also coached youth teams across the county and has developed a youth female goalkeeper that represented the United States in a U-16 game.

Janjuš additionally owns a number of local businesses including a bar which is filled with mementos and memorabilia from his football playing career.

Personal life
While an active footballer, Janjuš had relationships with table tennis player Erzsebet Palatinus, while playing for Vojvodina, and singer Izvorinka Milošević.

After moving to the United States, Janjuš met a woman of Serbian origin, Susanne Ferry, and after more than two decades of living together they were married in Las Vegas in 2016 and spent their honeymoon in Sarajevo. His daughter attended UNLV and currently resides in Las Vegas.

On 6 December 2009, Janjuš was arrested for domestic battery by the St. Petersburg Police.

Honours

Player

Club
Željezničar Sarajevo
Yugoslav First League: 1971–72

Valletta
Maltese Premier League: 1989–90

References

External links
 Stats from Yugoslav Leagues at Zerodic.com.

Living people
1952 births
Footballers from Sarajevo
Serbs of Bosnia and Herzegovina
Bosnia and Herzegovina footballers
Yugoslav footballers
Yugoslav expatriate footballers
Yugoslav emigrants to the United States
Association football goalkeepers
Yugoslav First League players
FK Željezničar Sarajevo players
FK Vojvodina players
FK Sarajevo players
NK Olimpija Ljubljana (1945–2005) players
GNK Dinamo Zagreb players
FK Sutjeska Nikšić players
Valletta F.C. players
Expatriate footballers in Malta
Yugoslav expatriate sportspeople in Malta
Mqabba F.C. players